Hollows are a landform on the planet Mercury, discovered during the MESSENGER mission that orbited the planet from 2011 to 2015.

Hollows are typically clusters of rimless depressions with flat floors and haloes of bright (high albedo) material surrounding them.  Hollows are thought to form by loss of volatiles from the surface by sublimation, caused by the intense solar radiation on the airless planet.  They are some of the youngest features on Mercury.

Hollows were first observed as bright areas within craters imaged by the Mariner 10 spacecraft in 1974, but the images were not of sufficient resolution to discern any detail.  These craters include Balzac, Tyagaraja, Theophanes, Zeami, and Hopper.

The MESSENGER spacecraft imaged the rest of the planet, much of it at higher resolution and in color, leading to the discovery of hollows and clues about their formation and nature.  Other craters where hollows are present include Warhol, Xiao Zhao, Seuss, Wergeland, Raditladi, Sholem Aleichem, Lermontov, Darío, and Scarlatti. Kertész, Sander, Nāwahī, and Balanchine are craters with hollows within the Caloris basin.  There are many other examples, and some hollows occur on the plains between craters (see Canova crater).

Views

External links
 
 What are Mercury's hollows? Emily Lakdawalla, The Planetary Society.  February 18, 2014.
 Short podcast on hollows, featuring mission scientist David Blewett of APL.

References

Surface features of Mercury